Rabii Doukkana (born 6 December 1987) is a French middle and long-distance runner of Moroccan origin. He gained French citizenship in 2011.

References

1987 births
Living people
French male long-distance runners
French male middle-distance runners
Moroccan male long-distance runners
Moroccan male middle-distance runners
Sportspeople from Rabat
21st-century French people